1917 is a year in the Gregorian calendar.

1917 may also refer to:

1917 (1970 film), a short British film by Stephen Weeks
1917 (2019 film), a British war film by Sam Mendes
"1917", a B-side instrumental by David Bowie on the 1999 album Hours

See also
1917–1987 (album), a 1987 album by the Leningrad Cowboys
1917 Club, a club for socialists in London
1917 Cuyo, an asteroid
M1917 (disambiguation)
Warfare 1917, a 2008 strategy game